The Katowice Open was a professional women's tennis tournament played on an indoor hard court in Katowice, Poland and was held in April. The event was affiliated with the Women's Tennis Association (WTA), and was an International-level tournament on the WTA Tour. Katowice Open replaced Danish Open since 2013 WTA Tour season. The official tournament ball was Babolat Roland Garros’. The organizer of the tournament was SOS Music company from Toruń, which had obtained the license from Octagon sport agency. Telewizja Polska had taken the television partnership of the event. The tournament was broadcast by TVP in April.

From 2014, the surface was changed from clay to hard.

Octagon chose to relocate the event to Biel/Bienne as the Ladies Open Biel Bienne beginning in 2017.

Past finals

Singles

Doubles

References

External links 
 Official web site
 Tournament info at WTA site

 
WTA Tour
Indoor tennis tournaments
Tennis tournaments in Poland
Sport in Katowice
Recurring sporting events established in 2013
Recurring sporting events disestablished in 2016
2013 establishments in Poland
Clay court tennis tournaments
Hard court tennis tournaments